Phoeurng Sackona (born 8 October 1959) is a Cambodian academic, engineer and politician who is the current Minister of Culture and Fine Arts. She is a member of the Cambodian People's Party. She also serves as the President of the Board of Trustees of the Institute of Technology of Cambodia. She is also the daughter-in-law of former Minister of Culture Chheng Phon.

Academic achievements

2002: Doctorate in Food Sciences, Microbiology, University of Burgundy
1998: DEA of Microbiology, École Nationale Supérieure de Biologie Appliquée à la Nutrition de l'Alimentation, University of Burgundy
1987: Master's degree, engineering science, Gubkhine Institute in Moscow, USSR
1986: Engineer's degree, chemical engineering, Institut de Technologie du Cambodge 
1981: High School Diploma, Phnom Penh, Cambodia

Political career

2013–: Minister of Culture and Fine Arts 
2008–: President of the Board of Directors, Institut de Technologie du Cambodge
2008–2013: Secretary of State for Ministry of Education, Youth and Sport
2003–2008: Director-General, Institut de Technologie du Cambodge
2000–2003: Deputy Director-General, Institut de Technologie du Cambodge
1994–2000: Dean, Faculty of Chemical Engineering, Institut de Technologie du Cambodge
1991–1994: Lecturer, Institut de Technologie du Cambodge
1987–1991: Staff, Ministry of Industry

References

Members of the National Assembly (Cambodia)
Living people
Cambodian People's Party politicians
Government ministers of Cambodia
University of Burgundy alumni
1959 births